The Two Jasons is a novel by Dave Stone, focusing on the life of Jason Kane, a character from the spin-off media based on the long-running British science fiction television series Doctor Who.  Jason is the ex-husband of the regular Big Finish series character Bernice "Benny" Summerfield, who appears in flashback.

The book does not feature the Doctor, although sections of it retell the events of the Doctor Who novel Death and Diplomacy from Jason's point of view.  The novel is also a sequel to the short story Sex Secrets of the Robot Replicants by Philip Purser-Hallard, originally published in the Bernice Summerfield anthology A Life Worth Living, and reprinted here.

Plot summary

A few years ago, Jason Kane created three clones of himself, to help him in a scam.  Afterwards, the replicants went their separate ways, but now somebody is trying to kill them.  Plagued by flashbacks of the original Jason's life, the surviving clones must join forces or die.  Or possibly both.

External links
Bernice Summerfield: The Two Jasons

2007 British novels
Bernice Summerfield novels
Big Finish New Worlds
British science fiction novels
Novels by Dave Stone